Høysand is a village in Sarpsborg municipality, Norway. Located just south of the village Skjeberg, it is a part of the urban area of the same name, which has a population of 1,919 at the 2006 census.

References

Villages in Østfold
Sarpsborg